Jaśkowo  (German Jäskendorf) is a village in the administrative district of Gmina Zalewo, within Iława County, Warmian-Masurian Voivodeship, in northern Poland.

Before 1945 the village was called Jäskendorf and was part of East Prussia in Germany.

The village has a population of 110.

References

Villages in Iława County